The 61st World Science Fiction Convention (Worldcon), also known as Torcon 3, was held on 28 August–1 September 2003 at the Metro Toronto Convention Centre and the Fairmont Royal York and Crowne Plaza (now the InterContinental Toronto Centre) hotels in Toronto, Ontario, Canada.

This convention was also the 2003 Canvention, and therefore presented the Prix Aurora Awards.

Participants

Guests of Honour 

 George R. R. Martin (pro)
 Frank Kelly Freas (artist), unable to attend due to illness
 Mike Glyer (fan)
 Spider Robinson (toastmaster)
 Robert Bloch (GoHst of honor)

Other notable programme participants

Awards

2003 Hugo Awards 

This was the first time that the 'Best Dramatic Presentation, Long Form' and 'Best Dramatic Presentation, Short Form' awards were presented as separate categories.

 Best Novel: Hominids by Robert J. Sawyer
 Best Novella: Coraline by Neil Gaiman
 Best Novelette: "Slow Life" by Michael Swanwick
 Best Short Story: "Falling Onto Mars" by Geoffrey A. Landis
 Best Related Book: Better to Have Loved: The Life of Judith Merril by Judith Merril and Emily Pohl-Weary
 Best Dramatic Presentation, Long Form: The Lord of the Rings: The Two Towers
 Best Dramatic Presentation, Short Form: "Conversations with Dead People", Buffy the Vampire Slayer
 Best Professional Editor: Gardner Dozois
 Best Professional Artist: Bob Eggleton
 Best Semiprozine: Locus
 Best Fanzine: Mimosa
 Best Fan Writer: David Langford
 Best Fan Artist: Sue Mason

Prix Aurora Awards 

This Worldcon being also the 2003 Canvention, it awarded the Prix Aurora Awards. They are given out annually for the best Canadian science fiction and fantasy literary works, artworks, and fan activities from that year, and are awarded in both English and French.

 Best Long-Form Work in English: Permanence by Karl Schroeder
 Best Long-Form Work in French: Le Revenant de Fomalhaut by Jean-Louis Trudel
 Best Short-Form Work in English: "Ineluctable" by Robert J. Sawyer
 Best Short-Form Work in French: "La Guerre sans temps", Sylvie Bérard
 Best Work in English (other): Be VERY Afraid! by Edo van Belkom
 Artistic Achievement: Mel Vavaroutsos
 Fan Achievement (publication): Made in Canada Newsletter, webzine, edited by Don Bassie
 Fan Achievement (organizational): Georgina Miles (Toronto Trek 16)
 Fan Achievement (other): Jason Taniguchi, one-man SF parody shows

Other awards 

 John W. Campbell Award for Best New Writer: Wen Spencer

Future site selection 

Two site selection votes were held at Torcon 3.
 Los Angeles, California won the vote for the 64th World Science Fiction Convention in 2006.
 Seattle, Washington won the vote for the 8th North American Science Fiction Convention in 2005.

Committee 

 Chair: Peter Jarvis
 Vice-chair: Ken Smookler

Division heads 

 Programming: Terry Fong
 Finance/Legal: Larry Hancock, Ken Smookler
 Facilities: Murray Moore
 Operations: Robbie Bourget
 Events: Kathryn Grimbly-Bethke
 Exhibits: Elaine Brennan
 Communications: Michelle Boyce
 Administration: Kent Bloom
 Member Services: Lance Sibley

Board of directors 

 President: Ken Smookler
 Directors: Peter Jarvis, Larry Hancock, Murray Moore, Jody Dix, Linda Ross-Mansfield, Hope Leibowitz

Bid 

 Bid Chair: Larry Hancock

See also 

 Hugo Award
 Science fiction
 Speculative fiction
 World Science Fiction Society
 Worldcon

References

External links 

 Official website 

2003 conferences
2003 in Toronto
Science fiction conventions in Canada
Worldcon